Free Democrats is an Armenian liberal, Pro-European political party. It was founded in 2011 by Khachatur Kokobelyan.

History
Some Free Democrats party members participated in the 2012 Armenian parliamentary election under the Heritage Party list. Following the election, Heritage won 5.78% of the vote.

The party participated in the 2017 Armenian parliamentary election, however the party won just 0.94% of the vote, failing to win any political representation. Khachatur Kokobelyan headed the party list, while Hrant Bagratyan (former Prime Minister of Armenia and leader of the Freedom Party) was the candidate for the post of Prime Minister.

Prior to the 2018 Armenian parliamentary election, the Free Democrats formed a political alliance known as the We Alliance with the Hanrapetutyun Party, another pro-Western and pro-European party in Armenia. During the election campaign, the Free Democrats advocated that Armenia should withdraw its membership from the Eurasian Union and pursue closer relations with the European Union. The party also advocated for visa-free travel for Armenian citizens to the EU's Schengen Area. The Alliance received 2.00% of the votes. As this was lower than the 5% minimum threshold required, the We Alliance of Hanrapetutyn and Free Democrats failed to gain any representation in the National Assembly.

In November 2019, the party hosted American Ambassador to Armenia Lynne M. Tracy at the parties headquarters in Yerevan, where a range of issues were discussed.

On 21 April 2021, the Free Democrats had confirmed it would participate in the 2021 Armenian parliamentary elections. However, the party ultimately did not register to participate. Currently, the party acts as an extra-parliamentary force.

Ideology
The Free Democrats believe in establishing a more democratic Armenia, including developing a stronger civil society, a liberal market economy, greater protection of the environment and integrating Armenia into the European Union. The party firmly believes that Armenia's future is connected with Europe.

Party leader Khachatur Kokobelyan, had previously submitted a draft resolution calling for Armenia's Eurasian Union membership to be terminated. Kokobelyan stated that, "After joining the Eurasian Union, Armenia has faced greater problems, for example, in its relations with the EU, than it has received dividends. I am confident that we do not need this organization. After leaving it, Armenia will have alternatives."

In addition, the Free Democrats believe in strengthening Armenia's democracy, promoting human rights and equality, the rule of law and support for civil society. In terms of economics, the party advocates for a strong liberal market economy and believes that by following the European path of development and standards, Armenia will achieve greater prosperity and security.

See also

Liberalism in Armenia
Programs of political parties in Armenia

References

External links 
 Official website
 Free Democrats on Facebook

Political parties established in 2011
2011 establishments in Armenia
Political parties in Armenia
Pro-European political parties in Armenia
Liberal parties in Armenia